The Carmagnola Grey rabbit is a rare breed from Italy, almost extinct. It is a large chinchilla-colored breed bred for meat. The coat of the Carmagnola Grey exhibits chinchilla coloration. Fewer than 500 specimens were found in a 2002 population study.

Diet
One of Carnmagnola's grey rabbits' diets consisted of perilla seeds (Perilla frutescens L.). Perilla seeds are considered as a supplement in their diet as it enhances with growth, development, and meat quality.

See also
List of rabbit breeds

References

Rabbit breeds
Rabbit breeds originating in Italy